David Matthews (born November 8, 1967) is an American author and screenwriter. Matthews is of African American and Jewish descent. His memoir Ace of Spades recounts growing up in the inner city of Baltimore, Maryland as a biracial child who could pass for white.

Matthews' Jewish mother had schizophrenia and left his father when Matthews was only a few months old. As a result, Matthews was raised by his father, Ralph Matthews, Jr., an African American journalist who counted Malcolm X and James Baldwin among his friends. The Matthews family lived in the Maryland suburbs of Washington, D.C., but in 1977 moved next to the segregated Bolton Hill area of Baltimore, a tiny enclave of rich, white families, which was surrounded by the primarily black ghetto of west Baltimore. He describes himself as not initially fitting in with either the black or white children in his public elementary school, sparking his decision to "pass" as white. Matthews attended Baltimore City College High School where he attempted to "pass" as not only white, but Jewish. Lacking any cultural knowledge of Jewish life, Matthews was not accepted as a Jew and continued to search for an identity. Matthews' first book, Ace of Spades details this search, and is presented in a somewhat acerbic coming-of-age literary style.

Matthews currently resides in New York City and Los Angeles.

Published work

He is the author of two non-fiction books. His first, "Ace of Spades", is an autobiographical memoir. His second, "Kicking Ass and Saving Souls" follows the adventurous life of Stefan Templeton.

His work has appeared in The New York Times, Salon, The Huffington Post, and he has contributed to "The Autobiographers Handbook".  He has also written the introduction for the Paris Review edition of The Catcher in the Rye.

Film and television

Matthews' television credits include Law & Order: Los Angeles; Story Editor for Law & Order: Special Victims Unit; Executive Story Editor for Season 4 of HBO's Boardwalk Empire; Co-Producer on F/X's Tyrant; and Supervising Producer on HBO's Vinyl.

See also
 Stefan Templeton

References

Sources
Smith Magazine - Memoirville - Interview with David Matthews

External links
Review of Ace of Spades (The New York Times)

1967 births
Living people
American memoirists
Jewish American writers
African-American writers
American biographers
21st-century African-American people
21st-century American Jews
20th-century African-American people